Mount Maru may refer to:

 Mount Maru (Esan), a volcano on the Kameda Peninsula of Hokkaidō
 Mount Maru (Hiroo), a mountain in the Hidaka Mountains of Hokkaidō
 Mount Maru (Kamishihoro-Shintoku), a volcano in the Nipesotsu-Maruyama Volcanic Group of Hokkaidō

See also
 Maruyama (disambiguation)